1968 college football season may refer to:

 1968 NCAA University Division football season
 1968 NCAA College Division football season
 1968 NAIA football season